Joseph Kirby Mahony II (September 12, 1939 – December 6, 2009) was an American lawyer and politician. A Democrat, Mahony served continuously as a member of the Arkansas General Assembly from 1971 to 2007.

References

External links
Jodie Mahony at the Encyclopedia of Arkansas

1939 births
2009 deaths
20th-century American politicians
21st-century American politicians
Democratic Party Arkansas state senators